Makedoniya (originally spelled Македонія) was a Bulgarian newspaper edited and published by Petko Slaveykov in Istanbul with the aim to help the foundation of an independent Bulgarian Church. Started  in 1866, Makedoniya was one of the first Bulgarian newspapers and among the most popular at the time; it published news items, articles and discussion papers in the Bulgarian language and sometimes in the Greek language. It was stopped from printing in 1872 after the creation of the Bulgarian Exarchate. The newspaper had the title "Macedonia", as its main task per Slaveykov himself, was to educate  the misguided (sic): Grecomans there, who he called Macedonists.

See also
 Makedonia, newspaper in Greece.
 Nova Makedonija, newspaper in the Republic of North Macedonia.

References

Defunct newspapers published in the Ottoman Empire
Bulgarian-language newspapers
Defunct weekly newspapers
Newspapers established in 1866
1866 establishments in the Ottoman Empire
Bulgarian National Revival